St. Laurentiusbukta is a bay in Albert I Land at Spitsbergen, Svalbard. The bay is located on Reuschhalvøya, east of Scheibukta, at the southern side of Bjørnfjorden. It is named after the saint Laurentius.

References

Bays of Spitsbergen